Lisa Kiggens (born August 13, 1972) is an American professional golfer who played on the LPGA Tour.

Kiggens was born in Salinas, California. She played college golf for one year at UCLA, earning All-American honors and helping her team win the NCAA Women's Division I Golf Championship.

Kiggens played on the LPGA Tour from 1992 to 2003, winning once in 1994.

Professional wins

LPGA Tour wins (1)

References

External links

American female golfers
UCLA Bruins women's golfers
LPGA Tour golfers
Golfers from California
Sportspeople from Salinas, California
1972 births
Living people